Hemigrammus ulreyi, commonly known as Ulrey's tetra,  is a Paraguayan tropical aquarium fish from the family Characidae named in honor of the biologist Albert B. Ulrey. It was originally named Tetragonopterus ulreyi in 1895.

In the aquarium
This aquarium fish suitable for a community aquarium can reach 5 cm (2 in) in length and does well at temperatures of 21 to 29 °C (70 to 85 °F).

Breeding
Dr. Herbert R. Axelrod, editor of Tropical Fish Hobbyist Magazine, and Dr. Leonard P. Schultz, retired curator of fishes at the Smithsonian Institution, wrote that the breeding of this species is a problem, since the species is nearly identical to Hyphessobrycon heterorhabdus and is difficult to spawn.

References

Tetras
Taxa named by George Albert Boulenger
Fish described in 1895